Jonathan Jackson may refer to:

Politicians
Jonathan Jackson (Massachusetts politician) (1743–1810), American merchant, Continental Congressman for Massachusetts and political leader
Jonathan Jackson (Illinois politician) (born 1966), American civil rights activist, businessman, professor, and U.S. Representative from Illinois

Sportspeople
Jonathan Jackson (linebacker) (born 1977), American football player
Jonathan Jackson (defensive end) (born 1981), American football defensive end

Others
Jonathan P. Jackson (1953–1970), brother of George Jackson and perpetrator of 1970 Marin County courthouse incident
Jonathan Jackson (actor) (born 1982), began career as child actor on General Hospital

See also
Jon Jackson (disambiguation)
John Jackson (disambiguation)